Fraus is a genus of moths of the family Hepialidae. There are 25 described species, all endemic to Australia.

Species
Fraus basicornis
Fraus basidispina
Fraus bilineata
Fraus biloba
Fraus crocea
Fraus distispina
Fraus furcata
Fraus fusca
Fraus griseomaculata
Fraus latistria – broad-striped ghost moth
Fraus linogyna
Fraus marginispina
Fraus mediaspina
Fraus megacornis
Fraus minima
Fraus nanus
Fraus orientalis
Fraus pelagia
Fraus pilosa
Fraus polyspila
Fraus pteromela
Fraus quadrangula
Fraus serrata
Fraus simulans – lesser ghost moth
Larva feeds on grasses
Fraus tedi

External links
Hepialidae genera

Hepialidae
Exoporia genera
Taxa named by Francis Walker (entomologist)